Benedicto de Moraes Menezes (30 October 1906 – 11 February 1944) was a Brazilian football player. He played for Brazil national team.

Honours

Club
 Campeonato Carioca (2): 
Botafogo: 1930, 1932

References

External links

1906 births
Year of death missing
Footballers from Rio de Janeiro (city)
Brazilian footballers
Brazil international footballers
1930 FIFA World Cup players
Expatriate footballers in Italy
Botafogo de Futebol e Regatas players
Fluminense FC players
S.S. Lazio players
Torino F.C. players
Serie A players
Association football forwards